Metacrangonyctidae is a family of crustaceans belonging to the order Amphipoda.

Genera:
 Longipodacrangonyx Boutin & Messouli, 1988
 Metacrangonyx Boutin & Messouli, 1988
 Metacrangonyx Chevreux, 1909

References

Amphipoda